PT Berau Coal Energy Tbk  is Indonesia's fifth largest coal producer.

History 
Berau Coal Energy was created in 1983, following the signing of a contract with the Indonesian government as sole mining contractor within the Berau regency of North Kalimantan. Production began in 1994.

Production 
Berau Coal operate three active mines (Lati, Sambarata and Binungan) at a single site in East Kalimantan. Estimated resources of about 2.6 billion tons, with probable and proven reserves estimated at 512 million tons (mt), lie within a single concession of around 118,400 hectares.

All three mines produce thermal coal, using conventional open pit mining techniques, primarily to supply the Chinese market.

Controversies 
Berau Coal was once part of the assets of Asia Resource Minerals, the renamed Bumi Plc, which Vallar, British financier Nat Rothschild's £700m cash shell, bought a stake in during July 2010.

After a series of internal disputes, board room battles and court inquiries into "financial irregularities" at Berau Coal, Amir Sambodo agreed to resign in March 2015 as president director of Berau. However, he failed to relinquish the position and refused to allow Asia Resource's chief financial officer, chief mining officer or his successor into the head office of Berau. For a while, Bumi executives acting on behalf of Rothschild only had limited access to Berau's accounting systems and bank account information.

In 2010, Asia Resource Minerals accused Another former president director of Berau Coal, Rosan Roeslani, of embezzlement. During the preparation of Berau's annual results for the year ended 31 December 2012, unexplained payments totalling $201 million were found to have been made in 2011 and 2012. In December 2015, Roeslani was ordered to hand over $173 million plus associated costs by a court in Singapore.

As part of an effort to restructure and take control of the business, Rothschild attempted to inject US$100 million into Berau Coal and sign a restructuring support agreement with creditors in February 2015 and however was trumped by a rival bid led by the Widjaja family.

The Widjaja's Sinar Mas subsidiary company, Asia Coal Energy Ventures, spearheaded by the 33-year-old Fuganto Widjaja, together with Argyle Street Management Ltd., countered on 7 May 2015 with a cash offer and alternative recapitalisation plan involving a $150 million cash injection and a restructuring support agreement similar to the one offered by Rothschild in May. In response Rothschild gave up his long battle for ARM and agreed to sell his 17.2% stake in June 2015.

Rothschild's holding company later commented on the affair that "This will be our first and last investment in Indonesia’s coal sector"

Defaults

Berau Capital Resources Pte issued US$450 million worth of 12.5% guaranteed senior secured notes, in 2015. PT Berau Coal Energy also issued US$500 million worth of 7.25% guaranteed senior notes in 2017. While these were to be restructured under an agreement with bondholders, the company later did not proceed with the deal. Both the 2015 and 2017 notes are currently in default. Since July 2015, the Berau Group has brought 4 separate rounds of scheme of arrangement / moratorium proceedings, with terms which have been described as "frankly insulting" at a time when global coal prices had doubled. None of the schemes has succeeded.

Suspension from the IDX

Berau Coal Energy has been delisted from the IDX since 16 November 2017, following multiple suspensions over the course of the last 2 years and failure to submit timely annual reports and financial statements since 2014.

New York Court Case

In April 2019, following the default of two bonds worth about US$1 billion, the Widjaja family was taken to court in New York by investors in Berau coal, seeking damages of US$165M plus interest. Legal advisers for the plaintiffs, a New York hedge fund, claimed in court that many of the tactics employed by the Widjaja family during the APP restructuring were being deployed again. The Financial Times noted that the case came as "concerns build over Indonesia’s political and economic environment".

At the end of the three-day trial in April 2019 for breach of contract, the Supreme Court of the State of New York jury unanimously awarded the two plaintiffs all of the damages sought, totalling more than $170M

See also 
 Sinar Mas Group 
 Asia Pulp and Paper
 Asia Resource Minerals
 Eka Tjipta Widjaja
 Fuganto Widjaja

References

External links
 

Coal companies of Indonesia
Mining companies of Indonesia
Indonesian companies established in 1983
Sinar Mas Group
Berau Regency
Companies listed on the Indonesia Stock Exchange
2010 initial public offerings